Felipe II is the name of two Spanish kings who ruled also over Portugal:

 Philip II of Spain (the I of Portugal)
 Philip II of Portugal (the III of Spain)

See also
Philip II (disambiguation)